Trepanning is a form of surgery in which a hole is bored into the skull.

Trepanation or Trepanning may also refer to:
 Trepanning (manufacturing), a type of drilling designed for large holes in metal and rock workpieces
 Trepanation (album), by American Head Charge
 Trepanation, a technique used by bomb disposal units

See also
 Trepan (disambiguation)